The UC Berkeley Graduate School of Journalism is a graduate professional school on the campus of University of California, Berkeley. It is among the top graduate journalism schools in the United States, and is designed to produce journalists with a two-year Master of Journalism (MJ) degree. It also offers a summer minor in journalism to undergraduates and a journalism certificate option to non-UC Berkeley students.

The school is located in North Gate Hall on the central campus of UC Berkeley. It is being served by dean Geeta Anand, who replaced Edward Wasserman on July 1, 2020 as an interim dean, and then was formally appointed as permanent dean on Oct 21, 2020.  Wasserman voluntarily stepped down six months before his expected departure in response to criticism by students about the lack of diversity in the administration.

Most courses offered by the school are on the graduate level, with a summer-only minor offered to undergraduates. The school enrolls approximately 120 students; 60 first-year and 60-second-year students, and is among the smaller graduate schools on the campus of UC Berkeley.

The school serves host to, or sponsors, a number of events. Notable speakers from around the world have shared their insights on current events in the media. Recent speakers have included Bill Clinton, Al Gore, Robert McNamara, Hans Blix, George Soros, Cokie Roberts, Paul Krugman, Dan Rather, Bob Woodruff, Ira Glass and Robert Krulwich.

Curriculum
The UC Berkeley Graduate School of Journalism focuses on six media platforms of journalism: Audio journalism, documentary film, narrative writing, multimedia, photojournalism, and video journalism. It is further separated into four reporting interests: health, international, investigative, and science and technology.

The school's focus is on professional practice rather than research, and requires students to perform an internship at a media outlet as a degree requirement between their first and second year of study.

Students are also required to take an introductory news reporting course called J200, where they publish in one of two hyperlocal news websites that are run by the school: Oakland North and Richmond Confidential.

Permanent faculty 
Geeta Anand, Dean, Professor of Reporting and former Pulitzer Prize winning foreign correspondent for the New York Times
David Barstow, Reva and David Logan Distinguished Professor in Investigative Reporting and four-time New York Times Pulitzer Prize winner.
Elena Conis, Professor and former Mellon Fellow in Health and Humanities at Emory University
Mark Danner, Professor and New Yorker writer, author
Bill Drummond, Professor and NPR Morning Edition founding editor
Richard Koci Hernandez, Associate Professor and former multimedia journalist at the San Jose Mercury News.
Ken Light, Reva and David Logan Professor of Photojournalism.
Michael Pollan, John S. and James L. Knight Professor of Science and Environmental Journalism, notable author on food topics
Jeremy Rue, Associate Dean and Associate Adjunct Professor of Computational Journalism.
Edward Wasserman, Professor; former professor at Washington and Lee University

In the news

In 2015, the estate of photographer Jim Marshall created the Jim Marshall Fellowships in Photography at the UC Berkeley Graduate School of Journalism's Center for Photography.

China expert and author Orville Schell served as dean of the school from 1996 to the summer of 2007. Before Schell, Thomas Goldstein served as dean from 1988 until he left to become the dean of Columbia University's Graduate School of Journalism. He stepped down from that position after five years, despite being credited for increasing endowments for that school from $54 million to $84 million over his short stint there. He is currently teaching a news writing class at UC Berkeley's Graduate School of Journalism. Pulitzer Prize-winning American media critic Ben Bagdikian also served as a past dean of the UC Berkeley's Graduate School of Journalism.

In 1981, actress Carol Burnett won a $1.6 million (later reduced to $800,000) libel award from The National Enquirer over an article that she said implied she had been intoxicated in a Washington restaurant. She donated a portion of that to the UC Berkeley Graduate School of Journalism saying she hoped the suit would teach aspiring journalists the dangers of defaming individuals in articles. The money was used to fund law and ethics courses.

North Gate Hall
The UC Berkeley Graduate School of Journalism is housed in North Gate Hall, a designated National Historic Landmark in the National Register of Historic Places. It is located immediately southeast of the intersection of Euclid and Hearst avenues in Berkeley, Calif., on the campus of UC Berkeley.

The name is derived from the general area in front of the school called "North Gate," represented by two stone pillars. It serves as the northernmost entrance of the primary University compound, and is opposite to Sather Gate, the southernmost entrance of the University.

North Gate Hall was built in 1904 as a  building known at the time as the "Ark" to house the architectural department. The building cost $4,394.59 to construct and consisted of an atelier, office for John Galen Howard and an architectural library with volumes donated by Phoebe Apperson Hearst – mother to William Randolph Hearst.

The building was one of many on campus which did not follow the typical Beaux-Arts architectural style, which had been regarded the most cultured, beautiful and "scientific" style of the cultural establishment at the time. Instead, the building was made only to be temporary, non-academic, or not particularly "serious." Other such buildings in the shingle or "Collegiate Gothic" style on campus include: North Gate Hall, Dwinelle Annex, Stephens Hall and the Men's Faculty Club.

The new addition was built further up the hill (easterly) and houses what is known today as the Greenhouse and upper and lower newsrooms.

In 1936, Walter Steilberg designed a library wing composed of reinforced concrete-panel, a stark contrast to the dark shingled appearance of the original building.

In 1957, the architecture school was united with the departments of Landscape Architecture, City and regional Planning, and Decorative Arts to form the College of Environmental Design. The "Ark" was relocated to Wurster Hall in 1964, and the building was renamed the Engineering Research Services Building. It later was renamed "North Gate Hall," and served as the location for the Graduate School of Journalism.

North Gate Hall was occupied by the journalism school in 1981.

In 1993 the building underwent extensive seismic renovations causing uproar from Berkeley preservationists who had saved the building from destruction 17 years earlier. It was reported by the San Francisco Chronicle that dry rot had set into much of the building. Damage from aging was so bad, one teacher said he could puncture a supporting column with his fountain pen. It was classified as Berkeley campus' most vulnerable buildings in an earthquake.

References

External links

Journalism
Journalism schools in the United States
Educational institutions established in 1967
1967 establishments in California
Journalism fellowships